John Mayo (died 1676) was a Puritan minister in pre-revolutionary Boston, Massachusetts. He was the first minister of Old North Church, also known as Second Church or Paul Revere's Church. This is the Old North Church that was in North Square (across the street from what became Paul Revere's house) until the church was dismantled and used by the British for firewood during the occupation of Boston during the Revolutionary War.

Biography

Early life
John Mayo was born in England and educated at Magdalen College, Oxford. While in England he was banned by the authorities from preaching publicly and was employed as a chaplain by William Fiennes, 1st Viscount Saye and Sele. He married his wife Tamisen Brike in England and had five children: Samuel, Hannah, Elizabeth, Nathaniel and John. The family came to New England in 1638 or 1639. He became a teacher at a church at Barnstable in Plymouth Colony, and was admitted a freeman on March 3, 1639-40 by the General Court in Plymouth. He moved to Eastham, Plymouth Colony around 1644, becoming the minister at a church that was gathered in that town. There he remained until 1655 when he was called to become pastor of the Old North Church in Boston.

Old North Meeting House (the Second Church of Boston)
Reverend Mayo was installed November 9, 1655. He preached the election sermon before the General Court of Massachusetts in 1658. He also served as an Overseer of Harvard College and the Boston Latin School. Already well advanced in years when he assumed the pastorate, Mayo grew very infirm later in his service and the congregation had difficulty hearing his sermons. He served until 1673 when Increase Mather took over. Mayo lived in a brick house on Hanover Street which was later occupied by Cotton Mather.

Later life
After retiring, Mayo went to his daughter's home and died in 1676 in Yarmouth, Massachusetts. His widow Tamisen died February 3, 1682.

Notable descendants
 George H. W. Bush - 41st President of the United States
 George W. Bush - 43rd President of the United States

References

External links
 Mayo Family website
 Rambles Around Boston

People from colonial Boston
1676 deaths
Year of birth missing
People from North End, Boston
17th-century New England Puritan ministers
17th century in Boston